Michael Evans (born July 22, 1977) is a 140 lb. 5'9" American lightweight boxer from Dayton, Ohio.  Evans has won numerous titles including the 1999 and 2005 Golden Gloves championships, National US Senior Open Gold Medalist-2005, and a National PAL Championships Gold Medalist in 2004.  Michael also represented the United States at the Olympic Team Trials finishing as a bronze medalist in 2000 and a bronze medalist in the World Goodwill Games in 1998.

Evans was raised in poverty and has spent seven years in prison, including a stint for dealing crack-cocaine. In 2010 Evans re-entered boxing after serving time in prison.

References

External links
Michael Evans profile on USA Boxing

1977 births
Living people
Boxers from Ohio
Sportspeople from Dayton, Ohio
American male boxers
Lightweight boxers
Competitors at the 1998 Goodwill Games